Here are listed people who were born and/or reside (or resided) in San Pedro, Los Angeles.

Aviation

 Larry Walters (1949–1993): piloted a lawn chair with 45 helium-filled weather balloons from his San Pedro residence.

Art

Acting

 Kirk Harris: actor and filmmaker, starred in The Kid: Chamaco; resides in the South Shores area of San Pedro
 Anthony Head: British actor, best known for roles in Joss Whedon's television series Buffy the Vampire Slayer and on BBC television production of Merlin; owns a home in San Pedro
 D. L. Hughley: comedian and actor; attended San Pedro High School
 Sasha Knezev: Serbian American filmmaker; American Addict, American Addict 2, Fragments of Daniela and Welcome to San Pedro
 Mike Lookinland: actor who played youngest brother "Bobby Brady" on The Brady Bunch, 1969–1974; lived in San Pedro while a child actor; attended Chadwick School on Palos Verdes Peninsula, just outside Northwest San Pedro 
 Dewey Martin: actor, known for roles in Howard Hawks' 1950s films; as of 2007, lived in San Pedro 
 Patrick Muldoon: actor, starred in recurring roles in soap operas, Days of Our Lives and Melrose Place; most well-known feature film is 1997's Starship Troopers; father was a lifeguard at Cabrillo beach in San Pedro

Music

 Ambrosia: rock band with numerous top 40 hits, such as "Biggest Part of Me" and "How Much I Feel"; formed in the South Bay/San Pedro area 
 John Bettis: lyricist for Michael Jackson, Madonna, The Carpenters, and Whitney Houston; nominated for an Academy Award, a Golden Globe, three Grammys, and three Emmys; graduated from San Pedro High School 
Blu: Los Angeles-based rapper and record producer who relocated with his family to San Pedro 
Chuck Dukowski: bass player for  1970s punk rock band Black Flag
 Pearlretta DuPuy: zither player, musician and civic activist
 Eric Erlandson: co-founder and lead guitarist of 1990s grunge rock band Hole; born and raised in San Pedro 
 Eva Gustavson: opera singer
Jim Korthe: vocalist for rap-metal group 3rd Strike; grew up in San Pedro and attended the Bishop Montgomery school as a teenager; died in his San Pedro home in 2010 
 Stephen Kovacevich: classical pianist and conductor
Miguel (born Miguel Jontel Pimentel): singer; native of San Pedro
 The Minutemen: eclectic punk rock trio formed in San Pedro, where its members grew up; the surviving former members, bassist/songwriter, Mike Watt, and drummer, George Hurley, still live there; Watt remains active in the city's music scene
 Krist Novoselic: grew up in San Pedro after his Croatian father emigrated to the Croatian enclave in the southern Californian city; Nirvana bassist 
 People Under The Stairs: hip hop group
 Art Pepper: jazz saxophonist; born in nearby Gardena, California, raised in San Pedro 
 Remble, prominent rapper for his 2021 well liked single "Touchable", born in San Pedro.
 Michael Quercio: Singer, songwriter, bassist in The Salvation Army, The Three O'Clock, Game Theory, Permanent Green Light, and Jupiter Affect. Born in Carson, California and has lived in San Pedro since 1998.
 Brenton Wood: 1960s pop-soul vocalist; achieved his biggest hit with "Gimme Little Sign", a song that reached #9 on the 1967 pop charts, and "The Oogum Boogum Song", released in the same year
 Rotting Out: Hardcore punk band formed in San Pedro

Politics

 John S. Gibson Jr.: Los Angeles City Council representative; founded the first Boys' Club of California in 1937; lived in San Pedro until his death in 1981 
 James Hahn: former Mayor of Los Angeles; a resident of the city as of 2011 
 Janice Hahn: former City Councilwoman (15th district), U.S. Congresswoman for the 36th District, and current Los Angeles County Supervisor representing the Fourth District; resides in the area as of 2011; her San Pedro Field Office is located at 302 W 5th St, #200 
 A.E. Henning: Rotarian Special Representative for Torrance; Los Angeles City Council member (1929–1931) 
 Joe Hill: radical songwriter, labor activist, and member of Industrial Workers of the World  (The Wobblies); lived and worked in San Pedro in the early 20th century; began his labor organizing activism in the area; secretary of San Pedro Wobblies chapter; imprisoned 30 days after role in organization of 1912 dockworkers' strike in which 200 Italian workers abandoned their posts  
 Yuri Kochiyama: human rights activist (in Harlem, New York and Oakland, California); Nobel Peace Prize nominee; worked with Black Power organizations; a leader of Asian American and redress movements in New York City 
 Mike Lansing: served two terms on Los Angeles Unified School District; executive director of Boys & Girls Clubs of Los Angeles Harbor as of 2011; born and raised in San Pedro 
 Jerry Sanders:  former Mayor of Los Angeles
 Vincent Thomas: elected as a California Assemblyman representing 68th District, 1940–1978; served 19 consecutive terms; Vincent Thomas Bridge was named in his honor in 196; Croatian immigrant who moved with his family to San Pedro at age 10

Science
 Sarah P. Monks (1841–1926): local naturalist, teacher, writer
 John Olguin: Director of the Cabrillo Marine Aquarium, 1949–1987; founding member of the American Cetacean Society; referred to as the "father of recreational whale watching"

Sports
 J. C. Agajanian (1913-1984): auto racing promoter and owner; member of Motorsports Hall of Fame of America; born in San Pedro
 Joe Amalfitano: baseball player, coach and manager; played for New York Giants (1954–1960), San Francisco Giants (1960–1962 and 1963), Houston Colt .45s (1962), Chicago Cubs (1964–1967), manager of Cubs (1979–81); born in San Pedro  
 Alan Ashby: catcher for Houston Astros, Toronto Blue Jays, and  Cleveland Indians between 1973 and 1989; sportscaster; born in Long Beach, attended high school in San Pedro 
 Denise Austin: fitness instructor and author; creator of more than 80 workout videos/DVDs; high sales totals led to 2003 induction in Video Hall of Fame 
Joel Bitonio:5x Pro Bowl and 5x All Pro National Football League Guard for the Cleveland Browns
 James Cotton Jr.: basketball player; 6-foot-5 forward; shooting guard for Chicago Bulls (1999) following terms with Seattle SuperSonics (1997–1999) and Denver Nuggets (1997); raised in San Pedro; attended high school in Lakewood  
 Joe Danelo: football placekicker; played for Washington State Cougars and New York Giants; raised three sons in San Pedro where he worked as a foreman on city's docks 
 Mario Danelo: record-setting placekicker for 2006 NCAA national champion USC Trojans; fell to his death at cliffs near Point Fermin lighthouse in early 2007 
Ralph DeQuebec: 2018 Paralympian Sled Hockey Gold Medalist. 
 Kevin Elster: 1986 World Series Champion Baseball player with the New York Mets
 Lillian Faralla: baseball player, All-American Girls Professional Baseball League
 Bob Gross: basketball player, forward for Portland Trail Blazers, 1977 NBA champions 
 Alfred Guth (1908–1996), Austrian-born American water polo player, swimmer, and Olympic modern pentathlete 
 Brian Harper: baseball player, catcher for 1991 World Series champion Minnesota Twins; born in Los Angeles, attended high school in San Pedro 
 Aaron Hicks: baseball player, outfielder for New York Yankees; born in San Pedro
 Dennis Johnson: basketball player for Boston Celtics in 1970s and 1980s, inducted into Hall of Fame in 2010; born in Compton, was discovered playing in local leagues in San Pedro 
 Richard Johnson: football player; 1984 USFL Receiver of the Year for Houston Gamblers; attended San Pedro High School 
 Ed Jurak: baseball player, infielder for Boston Red Sox during 1970s and 1980s; attended San Pedro High School 
 Garry Maddox: baseball player, eight-time Gold Glove winner and starting center fielder for 1980 World Series champion Philadelphia Phillies 
 Haven Moses: football player, wide receiver for Denver Broncos in 1970; remained with Broncos until his retirement in 1981, appeared in two Super Bowls; attended Fermin de Lasuen Catholic High in San Pedro 
 Willie Naulls (1934-2018): basketball player for UCLA; power forward/center for New York Knicks and Boston Celtics; four-time National Basketball Association (NBA) All-Star, won three NBA Championships with Celtics in 1960s; first African-American captain in history of integrated professional sports; at age 9, his family relocated to a government housing project in San Pedro 
 Robb Nen: baseball player, relief pitcher for Texas Rangers, Florida Marlins, and San Francisco Giants; three-time All-Star and 1997 World Series champion; born in San Pedro 
 Angela Nikodinov: figure skater; finished third at 2001 U.S. championships and fifth at world championships; hometown is San Pedro 
 Brian Ortega: UFC professional fighter
 Petros Papadakis: sports broadcaster, started show Petros & Money on AM 570/Fox Sports station in 2007; college football commentator on Fox Sports Net and hosted Spike TV's Pros vs. Joes; born in San Pedro
 Norm Schachter: football official for National Football League (NFL) who refereed first Super Bowl; died in San Pedro 
 Tim Wrightman: football player for UCLA; starting tight end (TE) for Super Bowl XX champion Chicago Bears; known as San Pedro's "Golden Boy"

Writers and poets

 Louis Adamic (1899–1951): Slovenian-American novelist who frequently wrote about Los Angeles; settled in San Pedro after serving in World War I and worked as watchman in office of harbor pilot during 1920s  
 Richard Armour: poet and author who wrote more than 60 books; born in San Pedro 
 Charles Bukowski: author and poet who lived in San Pedro during his later years; interviewed in his San Pedro home for 2004 documentary Bukowski: Born Into This
 Richard Henry Dana, Jr.: author of memoir Two Years Before the Mast; not a resident, but visitor to San Pedro who wrote about the experience; San Pedro's first middle school is named after him
 Jeanne Wakatsuki Houston: author of popular memoir Farewell to Manzanar on internment of Japanese-Americans during World War II;  briefly lived in East San Pedro (Terminal Island)
 Louis L'Amour: Western fiction writer, chronicled some of his San Pedro beach experiences in 1980 book Yondering
 Scott O'Dell (1898–1989): author of young adult literature, lived in East San Pedro (Terminal Island) during his childhood 
John Shannon: author of "Jack Liffey" series of noir thrillers; grew up in San Pedro

Film and television

 Tony Scott: producer, director, actor, cinematographer, writer, and editor; committed suicide  by jumping off Vincent Thomas Bridge in the San Pedro port district
 Robert Towne: four-time Academy Award-winning writer, director, producer, and actor; body of work includes screenplays for Chinatown (1974), Mission: Impossible (1996), Mission: Impossible 2 (2000), The Last Detail (1973), Shampoo (1975), The Firm (1993), and Greystoke: The Legend of Tarzan, Lord of the Apes (1984); raised in San Pedro, where he worked as a tuna fisherman

Organized crime

 Joe "Pegleg" Morgan: former head of a Mexican Mafia prison gang; in the 1960s, he was the link between the Mexican Mafia and the West Coast Italian crime syndicates; born in San Pedro to Croatian immigrants; moved to East Los Angeles as a teenager; basis for the character "JD" in the 1992 Edward James Olmos movie American Me

Organized labor 

 Jessica Gonzalez organizer with CODE-CWA; founder of A Better ABK; co-founder of ABK Workers Alliance and Game Workers Alliance

References

 
San Pedro